"Love Is Blind" is a song by American rapper Eve, released on August 31, 1999 as the second single from her debut studio album Let There Be Eve...Ruff Ryders' First Lady (1999). The song is directed toward a man who had been abusing Eve's best friend.

In 2001, the official remix featuring American singer Faith Evans was released from Eve's second studio album Scorpion.

Background
When Eve and her best friend Andrea were in high school, Andrea was in love with a man, with whom she became pregnant. The man had become increasingly abusive toward Andrea, culminating in him severely injuring her in a case of domestic violence. It led Eve to write the song, in which she recounts the abuse and raps to the man who was responsible: "I don't even know you and I'd kill you myself / You played with her like a doll and put her back on the shelf / Wouldn't let her go to school and better herself / She had a baby by your ass and you ain't giving no help". The last verse of the song tells a fictional story in which Eve's friend has been killed by her partner and Eve exacts revenge by shooting and killing the abuser.

Critical reception
The song received mostly positive reviews from critics. Richard Harrington of The Washington Post and Jeff Nieser of Miami New Times both regarded it as the best track from Let There Be Eve, while Greg Tate of Rolling Stone called it "bold" and "smart". A Dayton, Ohio radio programmer also praised the overall message of the song, but questioned the ending: "She shoots the guy. I mean, what is that saying to kids? That revenge is the answer?"

Music video
The official music video for "Love Is Blind" was directed by Dave Meyers. It depicts a man attacking a woman repeatedly and in front of their children, and the eventual deaths of both parents.

Charts

References

1999 singles
1999 songs
Eve (rapper) songs
Songs written by Eve (rapper)
Song recordings produced by Swizz Beatz
Songs written by Swizz Beatz
Ruff Ryders Entertainment singles
Interscope Records singles
Songs about domestic violence